Natural heritage refers to the sum total of the elements of biodiversity, including flora and fauna, ecosystems and geological structures. It forms part of our natural resources.

Definition 
Heritage is that which is inherited from past generations, maintained in the present, and bestowed to future generations. The term "natural heritage", derived from "natural inheritance", pre-dates the term "biodiversity". It is a less scientific term and more easily comprehended in some ways by the wider audience interested in conservation. 

The term was used in this context in the United States when Jimmy Carter set up the Georgia Heritage Trust  while he was governor of Georgia; Carter's trust dealt with both natural and cultural heritage. It would appear that Carter picked the term up from Lyndon Johnson, who used it in a 1966 Message to Congress.  (He may have gotten the term from his wife Lady Bird Johnson who was personally interested in conservation.)  President Johnson signed the Wilderness Act of 1964. 

The term "Natural Heritage" was picked up by the Science Division of The Nature Conservancy (TNC) when, under Robert E. Jenkins, Jr., it launched in 1974 what ultimately became the network of state natural heritage programs—one in each state, all using the same methodology and all supported permanently by state governments because they scientifically document conservation priorities and facilitate science-based environmental reviews. When this network was extended outside the United States, the term "Conservation Data Center (or Centre)" was suggested by Guillermo Mann and came to be preferred for programs outside the US.  Despite the name difference, these programs, too, use the same core methodology as the 50 state natural heritage programs. In 1994 The network of natural heritage programs formed a membership association to work together on projects of common interest: the Association for Biodiversity Information (ABI). In 1999, Through an agreement with The Nature Conservancy, ABI expanded and assumed responsibility for the scientific databases, information, and tools developed by TNC in support of the network of natural heritage programs. In 2001, ABI changed its name to NatureServe. NatureServe continues to serve as the hub of the NatureServe Network, a collaboration of 86 governmental and non-governmental programs including natural heritage programs and conservation data centers located in the United States, Canada, and Latin America.

Legal status

An important site of natural heritage or cultural heritage can be listed as a World Heritage Site by the World Heritage Committee of UNESCO.  The UNESCO programme, catalogues, names, and conserves sites of outstanding cultural or natural importance to the common heritage of humanity.  As of March 2012, there are 936 World Heritage Sites: 725 cultural, 183 natural, and 28 mixed properties, in 153 countries.

The 1972 UNESCO World Heritage Convention established that biological resources, such as plants, were the common heritage of mankind or as was expressed in the preamble: "need to be preserved as part of the world heritage of mankind as a whole". These rules probably inspired the creation of great public banks of genetic resources, located outside the source-countries.

New global agreements (e.g., the Convention on Biological Diversity), national rights over biological resources (not property). The idea of static  conservation of biodiversity is disappearing and being replaced by the idea of dynamic conservation, through the notion of resource and  innovation.

The new agreements commit countries to conserve biodiversity, develop resources for sustainability and share the benefits resulting from their use. Under new rules, it is expected  that bioprospecting or collection of natural products has to be allowed by  the biodiversity-rich country, in exchange for a share of the  benefits.

In 2005, the World Heritage Marine Programme was established to protect marine areas with Outstanding Universal Values.

References 

Natural resources
Cultural heritage
Biodiversity
Environmental conservation
Environmental science
Environmental education